Stéphan Raheriharimanana (born 16 August 1993), commonly known as Dada, is a Malagasy footballer who plays as a defensive midfielder in the French leagues and previously capped for Madagascar.

Club career
On 27 July 2016, out-of-contract Raheriharimanana joined Red Star on a three-year contract and was given the number 20 shirt. In January 2019, Raheriharimanana left the club.

International career
Raheriharimanana was called up to the Madagascar national team in 2016 and made his international debut in an AFCON qualification tie against Angola which ended 1–1 in September 2016.

References

1993 births
Living people
People from Toamasina
Malagasy footballers
Association football midfielders
Madagascar international footballers
Ligue 1 players
Ligue 2 players
OGC Nice players
Red Star F.C. players